Church of the Nativity is a historic small Gothic Revival frame church building located at 15615 Laurel Street in Rosedale, Louisiana that is part of the Episcopal Diocese of Louisiana.

Built in 1859 by Mr. John Philson, the church was consecrated by Bishop Leonidas Polk on April 22, 1860. The simple rectangular three-bay structure with a steeply pitched roof has been altered very little since its construction.

The church was added to the National Register of Historic Places on August 11, 1982.

See also
National Register of Historic Places listings in Iberville Parish, Louisiana

References

Churches on the National Register of Historic Places in Louisiana
Carpenter Gothic church buildings in Louisiana
Churches completed in 1859
Buildings and structures in Iberville Parish, Louisiana
National Register of Historic Places in Iberville Parish, Louisiana